Paul Juntunen (also known as Paul Jayson; February 13, 1921 – October 16, 2004) was an American professional basketball player. He played in the National Basketball League for the Detroit Gems and Detroit Vagabond Kings and averaged 4.0 points per game. Later in his life, Paul changed his last name from Juntunen to Jayson.

References 

1921 births
2004 deaths
American men's basketball players
Basketball players from Michigan
Detroit Gems players
Detroit Vagabond Kings players
Forwards (basketball)
Guards (basketball)
People from Sault Ste. Marie, Michigan
Wayne State Warriors men's basketball players